Greer Peak is a prominent peak, the northernmost of the Wiener Peaks, in the Denfeld Mountains of the Ford Ranges in Marie Byrd Land, Antarctica. It was mapped by the United States Antarctic Service (1939–41) led by Rear Admiral Richard E. Byrd, and was named for Dr. William E. R. Greer, personal physician to Admiral Byrd in the 1950s.

References

Mountains of Marie Byrd Land